Dompu is a town and the administrative centre of the Dompu Regency, located in the eastern part of the island of Sumbawa, in central Indonesia's province of West Nusa Tenggara. It is the third largest town on the island of Sumbawa, with a population of 49,854 at the 2010 Census, which by the 2020 Census had grown to 54,987. It is connected by provincial road to Bima and Sape.

History
Dompu (or Dompo) was once one of the four sultanates on the island of Sumbawa.

Geography
The city is located in the middle part of eastern section of the Sumbawa island.

Climate
Dompu has a tropical savanna climate (Aw) with moderate to little rainfall from May to October and heavy rainfall from November to April.

Administration
The town is divided into 16 communities (kelurahan).

References

External links 
 

Populated places in West Nusa Tenggara
Regency seats of West Nusa Tenggara